Margaret Magennis, Viscountess Iveagh (1673–1744), also known as Margaret Butler, was the mother of John Butler, the de jure 15th Earl of Ormond. She is remembered by the song A Lament for Kilcash.

Birth and origins 
Margaret was born in 1673 as the eldest daughter of William Burke and his second wife Helen MacCarty. Her father was the 7th Earl of Clanricarde. The Burkes were an Old English family. Margaret's mother was her father's second wife and the eldest daughter of Donough MacCarty, 1st Earl of Clancarty. The MacCartys were a Gaelic family. Both parents were Roman Catholic. Her parents had married in 1669.

Her father's first wife had been Lettice, daughter of Henry Shirley, an English baronet, and a Protestant. Margaret had half-siblings from her father's first marriage. Her mother also had been married before, but that marriage had been childless.

Margaret was one of four siblings, but she also had half-brothers from her father's first marriage. Both are listed in her father's article.

First marriage 
Margaret married twice. She married first in 1689 Bryan Magennis, 5th Viscount Iveagh, from County Down in Ulster. He supported King James II, was attainted and took Austrian service. He died in 1693. The marriage seems to have been childless.

She seems to have fled to Limerick at the end of the Williamite War, at least she is mentioned among the people that were allowed to leave Galway for Limerick when Henry, 8th Viscount Dillon, surrendered the town to Ginkel on 26 July 1691.

Second marriage and children 
In 1696 she married secondly Colonel Thomas Butler of Garryricken, also known as Thomas Butler of Kilcash, the grandson of Richard Butler of Kilcash.

 
Thomas and Margaret three sons:
Richard Butler (died 1711), who died of a fall from his horse at Kilcash.
Walter Butler, who died of smallpox at the Royal Academy at Paris.
John Butler (died 1766), who became de jure the 15th Earl of Ormond and inherited the estates of Richard Butler, 1st Earl of Arran but died childless.

—and five daughters:
Mary Butler, who married Bryan Cavanagh, of Borris, County Carlow.
Honora Butler (died 1730), who married Valentine, Lord Kenmare, in November 1720.
Hellen Butler, who married firstly Mr Esmond, and secondly, Richard Butler of Westcourt.
Margaret Butler (died 1743), who married George Matthew of Thurles, afterward of Thomastown. and
Catharine Butler, who became the third wife of James Mandeville, of Ballydine.

Death 
She died on 19 July 1744 at Kilcash Castle. She is buried in the Butler Mausoleum at Kilcash. She is also remembered by the nineteenth-century Irish song 'A Lament for Kilcash', which was written in her memory.

Notes and references

Notes

Citations

Sources 

 
  – (for Clanricarde, Ormond, and Shirley under Ferrers)
 
  – Jim Burke!
  – L to M (for Magennis)
  – Canonteign to Cutts (for Clanricarde)
  – Scotland and Ireland
 
  – Blood royal, dukes, earls (for Clanricarde)
  – Viscounts (for Butler, Viscount Mountgarret)
 

1673 births
17th-century Irish women
1744 deaths
18th-century Irish women
House of Burgh